This is a list of the National Register of Historic Places listings in Grayson County, Texas.

This is intended to be a complete list of properties and districts listed on the National Register of Historic Places in Grayson County, Texas. There are one district and eight individual properties along with one former property listed on the National Register in the county. Seven individually listed properties are Recorded Texas Historic Landmarks including one that is also a State Historic Site. The district contains an additional Recorded Texas Historic Landmark.

Current listings

The locations of National Register properties and districts may be seen in a mapping service provided.

|}

Former listings

|}

See also

National Register of Historic Places listings in Texas
List of Texas State Historic Sites
Recorded Texas Historic Landmarks in Grayson County

References

External links

Registered Historic Places
Grayson County
Buildings and structures in Grayson County, Texas